The Giants Challenge is a one-day mountain-bike marathon held in April in the Giant's Castle area of the Drakensberg Mountains in South Africa.

References

External links
Archived official website

Mountain biking events in South Africa
Spring (season) events in South Africa